Yénier Márquez Molina (born 3 January 1979) is a Cuban former footballer who played as a defender.

He is the Cuba national team's most capped player of all-time.

Club career
Born in Corralillo, Márquez he his senior debut with FC Villa Clara in 1999. In 2013, Marquez was the Cuban league's top goalscorer with 16 and in 2014 he was voted Cuban footballer of the year.

He played for Antiguan side Green Bay Hoppers.

International career
Nicknamed El Croqui, he made his international debut for Cuba in a May 2000 FIFA World Cup qualification against Barbados, and has earned a total of 126 caps, scoring 16 goals. He represented his country in 19 FIFA World Cup qualifying matches. He played in five FIFA World Cup qualification campaigns and at eight CONCACAF Gold Cups.

His final international was a July 2015 CONCACAF Gold Cup match against Guatemala.

Personal life
Since football players are not allowed to play professionally in Cuba, Márquez also had a job as motorcycle taxi driver.

Career statistics
Scores and results list Cuba's goal tally first, score column indicates score after each Márquez goal.

See also
 List of men's footballers with 100 or more international caps

References

1979 births
Living people
People from Corralillo
Cuban footballers
Association football central defenders
Cuba international footballers
FC Villa Clara players
Hoppers F.C. players
2002 CONCACAF Gold Cup players
2003 CONCACAF Gold Cup players
2005 CONCACAF Gold Cup players
2007 CONCACAF Gold Cup players
2011 CONCACAF Gold Cup players
2013 CONCACAF Gold Cup players
2015 CONCACAF Gold Cup players
2014 Caribbean Cup players
FIFA Century Club
Cuban expatriate footballers
Cuban expatriate sportspeople in Antigua and Barbuda
Expatriate footballers in Antigua and Barbuda